The y-patterned moray eel (Gymnothorax berndti) is a deep-water moray eel found in coral reefs in the Pacific and western Indian Oceans at depths to 300 m. It was first named by Snyder in 1904, and is also commonly known as Berndt's moray eel.

References

Y-patterned moray eel
Fish of the Pacific Ocean
Fish of the Indian Ocean
Fish of Hawaii
y-patterned moray eel